Sharyn Elizabeth Alfonsi (born June 3, 1972) is an American journalist and correspondent for 60 Minutes. She made her debut appearance on 60 Minutes on March 1, 2015. In 2019, she was awarded the prestigious duPont-Columbia journalism award.

Early life and education 
Alfonsi attended high school in McLean, Virginia. She graduated with honors from the University of Mississippi in Oxford in 1994, where she was a James Love Scholar.

Career
Alfonsi began her career in local news at KHBS-KHOG-TV in Fort Smith, Arkansas, in 1995 then WVEC-TV in Norfolk, Virginia, and KIRO-TV in Seattle, Washington, and later WBZ-TV in Boston, MA. She was hired by Dan Rather at CBS News in 2002. She left CBS in 2008 to work for ABC News. She returned to CBS in 2011, to work for 60 Minutes Sports, which aired on Showtime.

In 2015, Sharyn Alfonsi made her debut appearance on 60 Minutes with an investigative story about fraud after Hurricane Sandy which led to a congressional investigation and earned her a Writers Guild Award.

She appeared multiple times on 60 Minutes in the 2016–2017 season, including an investigative piece on hacking phones that showed how hackers could easily access a Congressman's phone.

In 2018, she was featured on the season premiere of 60 Minutes with a revealing interview with Paul McCartney, which drew more than 13 million viewers.  McCartney admitted that he couldn't read music, was wildly insecure, and worried about his legacy.

In 2019, Alfonsi received two Emmy awards for her reporting following the Parkland High School shooting.

Alfonsi made international news in 2020 when she was the first reporter to obtain photos from inside the jail cell of convicted felon Jeffrey Epstein and his autopsy photos which aired on 60 Minutes.

Recognition 
In 2020, Alfonsi and her 60 Minutes producers won the Alfred I. duPont–Columbia University Award for their report On the Border from the US/Mexico border.  During her acceptance speech Alfonsi dedicated the award to everyone who called her a “pain in the ass”. She was also recognized in 2020 with a Gracie Award by the Alliance for Women in Media for Outstanding News/News Magazine talent.

Personal life
Alfonsi is married and has two children. In May 2013, she gave the commencement address at the Meek School of Journalism and New Media at the University of Mississippi. Her speech was named by NPR as one of The Best Commencement Speeches Ever.

References

1972 births
American television reporters and correspondents
American women television journalists
Living people
People from McLean, Virginia
University of Mississippi alumni
ABC News personalities
CBS News people
60 Minutes correspondents
21st-century American women